Michał Grocholski (1705–1765) was a Polish szlachcic.

He was Cześnik of Braclaw since 1736, District judge of Braclaw since 1744 and Rotmistrz of an Armoured Cavalry Regiment (Chorągiew pancerna), designated by King August III of Poland.

1705 births
1765 deaths
Michal